André Eugène Sablon (22 May 1896, Paris – 9 August 1947, Paris) was a 20th-century French composer. Prematurely died at the age of 51, he is buried at Montparnasse Cemetery.

Film score 
1931: The Polish Jew, by Jean Kemm
1932: Montmartre, village d'amour (documentary)
1944: Behold Beatrice, by Jean de Marguenat.

External links 
 André Sablon on data.bnf.fr
 

French composers
Musicians from Paris
1896 births
1947 deaths
Burials at Montparnasse Cemetery